Robby Ginepri was the defending champion, but lost in the second round to fellow American and eventual champion Mardy Fish. Fish won his second title of 2010 and in July by defeating compatriot John Isner 4–6, 6–4, 7–6(7–4).

Seeds
The top four seeds receive a bye into the second round.

Draw

Finals

Top half

Bottom half

References
 Main draw
 Qualifying Singles draw

Singles